The 4th New York Infantry Regiment was an infantry regiment that served in the Union Army during the American Civil War. It is also known as the 1st Scott's Life Guard.

Service
The regiment was organized in New York City and was mustered in for a two-year enlistment on May 2, 1861.

The regiment was mustered out of service on May 25, 1863.

Casualties
The regiment suffered 64 deaths from wounds and 24 from other causes, for a total of 88 fatalities.

Commanders
Colonel Alfred W. Taylor
Colonel John Dunn MacGregor

See also
List of New York Civil War regiments

References

External links
New York State Military Museum and Veterans Research Center - Civil War - 4th Infantry Regiment History, photograph, table of battles and casualties, Civil War newspaper clippings, historical sketch, and battle flag for the 4th New York Infantry Regiment.
Burhaus Family papers at the University of Maryland libraries. Herman Burhaus was a volunteer 4th New York Volunteer Infantry Regiment. The papers contain correspondence between Burhaus and his family.

Infantry 004
1861 establishments in New York (state)
Military units and formations established in 1861
Military units and formations disestablished in 1863